Padar is a village and municipality in the Hajigabul Rayon of Azerbaijan. It has a population of 744.

References

Populated places in Hajigabul District